The bare-eyed pigeon (Patagioenas corensis) is a species of bird in the family Columbidae. It is found in Colombia, Venezuela, and the Netherlands Antilles.

Taxonomy and systematics

At least one author has asserted that based on plumage similarities the bare-eyed pigeon, picazuro pigeon (P. picazuro), spot-winged pigeon (P. maculosa), and scaled pigeon (P. speciosa) form a monophyletic group. Others argue that significant vocal differences belie that.

The bare-eyed pigeon is monophyletic.

Description

Male and female plumage is the same. Their head, neck, and breast are mauve-pink. The orange-brown eye is surrounded by bare skin, a narrow blue ring and a wider outer area of reddish brown. The neck and upper back have a bronze-black and pale brown scaled appearance and the lower back and rump are pale bluish gray. The chin and vent region are white. The closed wing shows a broad white patch. The juvenile is a paler version of the adults.

Distribution and habitat

The bare-eyed pigeon is found on the Caribbean coasts of Colombia and Venezuela and the near-shore islands of Aruba, Curaçao, Bonaire, Margarita, and Blanquilla. It primarily inhabits an arid landscape of thorn scrub, cactus, and acacia and is also found in mangroves and cultivated areas.

Behavior

Feeding

The bare-eyed pigeon does most of its foraging in trees and shrubs but also feeds on the ground. Its diet is seeds and fruits of trees, vines, and cultivated crops.

Breeding

The bare-eyed pigeon's breeding cycle appears to be triggered by rain. The nest is a fragile platform of twigs in a tree or shrub. It is so thin that the species' single egg can be seen through it from below.

Vocalization

The bare-eyed pigeon's song is "a rhythmic series of coos...rwhoh...woh-hu-whOAh...woh-hu-whOAh..woh-hu-whOAh...".

Status

The IUCN has assessed the bare-eyed pigeon as being of Least Concern. It is "[h]eavily hunted and therefore shy and timid, but appears to be relatively secure."

References

bare-eyed pigeon
Birds of Colombia
Birds of Venezuela
Birds of the Netherlands Antilles
bare-eyed pigeon
bare-eyed pigeon
Taxonomy articles created by Polbot